This is a list of members of the Northern Territory Legislative Assembly from 1983 to 1987.

 CLP member Paul Everingham resigned on 22 October 1984 to contest the House of Representatives seat of Northern Territory; CLP candidate Rick Setter won the resulting by-election on 15 December 1984.
 CLP member Jim Robertson resigned on 27 March 1986; CLP candidate Eric Poole won the resulting by-election on 19 April 1986.
 CLP member Ian Tuxworth was sacked from the Country Liberal Party on 9 December 1986. He spent two weeks as an independent member before announcing on 23 December that he would be joining the new Northern Territory Nationals party and serving as their leader.

See also
1983 Northern Territory general election

Members of Northern Territory parliaments by term
20th-century Australian politicians